Micro-retailing, or microretailing, has two distinct meanings.  The first describes how some businesses are moving from having giant superstores to smaller, demographically targeted stores that focus on a small selection of popular products.  The second refers to small, independent, family owned businesses in developing nations.

See also 

Retailing
Microfinance
Microcredit
Microinsurance

References 

Retail formats
Economic development
Poverty
Social economy